Henry Wood Hall is the name of two orchestral performance halls in the United Kingdom named after the conductor Sir Henry Wood:

 Henry Wood Hall, Glasgow
 Henry Wood Hall, London